Launch Complex 2  may refer to:

 Cape Canaveral Air Force Station Launch Complex 2, a deactivated US Air Force launch site
 Vandenberg AFB Space Launch Complex 2, an active rocket launch site in California, USA
 Xichang Launch Complex 2, an active rocket launch site in the People's Republic of China
 Rocket Lab Launch Complex 2, an under construction space rocket launch site in Virginia, USA

See also

 Launch Complex (disambiguation)
 
 LC2 (disambiguation)